Richard Gillow (1733–1811) was an English architect and businessman from Lancaster.  He was the son of the carpenter Robert Gillow, the founder of Gillows of Lancaster and London, a successful cabinet-making firm.

Richard trained as an architect in London. In 1757 he became a partner in the family firm, which took the name Robert Gillow & Son. He continued to undertake architectural work, including Lancaster's Custom House of 1764. The building has been described as "a notable and complete example of an eighteenth-century custom house, of Palladian design".

Richard and his wife Sarah had eight children, five daughters and three sons; Robert [iii] Gillow; George [ii] Gillow; and Richard [iii] Gillow, all joined the family firm.

See also
Robert Gillow
Joseph Gillow
Paulyn Gillow

References

External links

1733 births
1811 deaths
Architects from Lancashire